William Nelson Runyon (March 5, 1871 – November 9, 1931) was the acting governor of New Jersey from 1919 to 1920 and a United States district judge of the United States District Court for the District of New Jersey.

Runyon was nominated by President Warren G. Harding on December 30, 1922, to a new seat created by 42 Stat. 837; He was confirmed by the United States Senate on January 16, 1923, and received commission the same day. Runyon's service was terminated on November 9, 1931, due to death.

Education and career

Born on March 5, 1871, in Plainfield, New Jersey, Runyon received an Artium Baccalaureus degree in 1892 from Yale University and a Bachelor of Laws in 1894 from New York Law School. He was a member of the Plainfield Common Council from 1897 to 1898. He was a Judge of the Plainfield Municipal Court from 1899 to 1910. He was a member of the New Jersey General Assembly from 1915 to 1917. He was a member of the New Jersey Senate from 1918 to 1922. He served as Acting Governor of New Jersey from 1919 to 1920. He was a member of the Republican Party.

Federal judicial service

Runyon was nominated by President Warren G. Harding on December 30, 1922, to the United States District Court for the District of New Jersey, to a new seat authorized by 42 Stat. 837. He was confirmed by the United States Senate on January 16, 1923, and received his commission the same day. His service terminated on November 9, 1931, due to his death in Plainfield. He was interred in Hillside Cemetery in Scotch Plains, New Jersey.

References

Sources
 
 

1871 births
1931 deaths
Politicians from Plainfield, New Jersey
Yale University alumni
New York Law School alumni
New Jersey lawyers
Republican Party governors of New Jersey
Republican Party members of the New Jersey General Assembly
Republican Party New Jersey state senators
Presidents of the New Jersey Senate
New Jersey state court judges
Judges of the United States District Court for the District of New Jersey
United States district court judges appointed by Warren G. Harding
20th-century American judges
Burials at Hillside Cemetery (Scotch Plains, New Jersey)